Nicolás Mario Domingo (born 8 April 1985 in Totoras, Santa Fe) is an Argentine football midfielder who currently plays for Argentine Primera División side Banfield.

Career
Domingo embarked on his playing career in 2005, making his league debut in a 2–1 home defeat to Gimnasia y Esgrima de La Plata. In 2008, he was loaned to Italian club Genoa but did not make an appearance for the first team.

In 2010 he joined Arsenal de Sarandí, again on loan.

In 2011, he decided to return to River Plate and help the team return to the top flight of Argentine football. River Plate had been recently relegated for the first time in their history.

Titles

References

External links
Guardian statistics
 Argentine Primera statistics

1985 births
Living people
Argentine footballers
Argentine expatriate footballers
Association football midfielders
Club Atlético River Plate footballers
Arsenal de Sarandí footballers
Peñarol players
C.D. Cuenca footballers
Genoa C.F.C. players
Club Atlético Banfield footballers
Club Atlético Independiente footballers
Serie A players
Ecuadorian Serie A players
Argentine Primera División players
Primera Nacional players
Uruguayan Primera División players
Paraguayan Primera División players
Argentine expatriate sportspeople in Italy
Argentine expatriate sportspeople in Uruguay
Argentine expatriate sportspeople in Ecuador
Argentine expatriate sportspeople in Paraguay
Expatriate footballers in Italy
Expatriate footballers in Uruguay
Expatriate footballers in Ecuador
Expatriate footballers in Paraguay
Sportspeople from Santa Fe Province